MUSC Health University Medical Center is a university hospital associated with the Medical University of South Carolina, based in Charleston, South Carolina with additional sites located throughout the state.

In 1946, the South Carolina General Assembly passed a $4 million bill to construct a new teaching hospital that was brought under the control of the Medical College of South Carolina. Construction began in 1951 and the Medical College of South Carolina Hospital was completed and dedicated on May 10, 1955 with its doors opening on September 26, 1955, to its first patients. It was later renamed to the Medical University of South Carolina Hospital (MUSC) and is now MUSC Health University Medical Center.

The MUSC Health Transplant Center is one of the top ten kidney transplantation centers in the nation. The MUSC Health Transplant Center is supported by the only HLA Laboratory in South Carolina. MUSC Health University Medical Center is the regional referral center for the Lowcountry of South Carolina.

Plans were announced in 2017 for a new 126,000-square-foot outpatient facility to be constructed in the former JCPenney building at Citadel Mall in West Ashley. The two-story complex will be completely renovated with the lower level used for surgery and procedures, radiology and therapy; a second floor will hold physician offices and examination rooms.

The Phase I Replacement Hospital with 156 beds was completed in 2008 and a new Bee Street Parking Garage opened for employee and rehab patient parking. The Pediatric Trauma Center/Emergency Room was re-built, opening in first quarter 2009. The long-term plan includes 4 more phases of construction which will provide an updated trauma center, adult rooms and expanded Children's Hospital.

Allegations of racism

In the summer of 1969, Coretta Scott King, the widowed wife of the civil rights hero Dr Martin Luther King Jr., led a strike of hundreds of black women nurses at MUSC. Although the strike failed to win the workers their desired collective bargaining rights, it did bring their concerns of unequal treatment to the attention of MUSC management.

In 2018 many black women working at MUSC argue little has changed and at least two workers sued for redress, claiming they have been the victims of systemic racism. Workers allege that whites are given favoritism in promotions and are less often fired, that the grievance panel discriminates against blacks, and that there is a long-standing problem with racist language and behavior involving managers. "There are a handful of white managers who are just notorious for being racists," said Kerry Taylor, a labor historian at nearby Citadel Military College.

The hospital vehemently denies these allegations.

Transgender healthcare

In late 2022, following pressure from Republican lawmakers, the MUSC ended its program providing gender affirming care to trans adolescents.

References

Hospital buildings completed in 1955
Teaching hospitals in South Carolina
Medical University of South Carolina
Buildings and structures in Charleston, South Carolina
1955 establishments in South Carolina
Trauma centers